Mason and Dixon Survey Terminal Point is a historic marker located near Pentress, West Virginia, United States. Located on the boundary between Monongalia County, West Virginia and Greene County, Pennsylvania, it identifies the terminal station established by Charles Mason and Jeremiah Dixon on Brown's Hill on October 19, 1767.  The stone placed on Brown's Hill in 1883 in the mound of 1767, marks the westernmost point reached by Mason and Dixon in delineating the common boundaries of Pennsylvania, Maryland, Delaware, and Virginia (now West Virginia), and known as the Mason–Dixon line.

It was listed on the National Register of Historic Places in 1973.

See also
Star Gazers' Stone

References

Initial points
Monuments and memorials on the National Register of Historic Places in Pennsylvania
National Register of Historic Places in Greene County, Pennsylvania
National Register of Historic Places in Monongalia County, West Virginia
Historic surveying landmarks in the United States
Buildings and structures in Monongalia County, West Virginia
1767 establishments in the Thirteen Colonies
Monuments and memorials on the National Register of Historic Places in West Virginia
Mason–Dixon line